Xavier Méride  (born 9 January 1975) is a retired French football defender.

Whilst at Lens Méride, he contributed seven appearances as his side won 1997–98 French Division 1.

Honours

Club
Lens
 Ligue 1:1998
 Coupe de la Ligue: 1999

Dinamo Bucharest
 Liga I: 2004

References

External links
 
 

1975 births
Living people
Association football defenders
French footballers
Footballers from Paris
RC Lens players
Toulouse FC players
FC Dinamo București players
US Créteil-Lusitanos players
Ligue 1 players
Ligue 2 players
Expatriate footballers in Romania
Liga I players
French expatriate sportspeople in Romania
SO Romorantin players
Wasquehal Football players